The Focke-Wulf Fw 43 Falke (German: "Falcon") - known internally to Focke-Wulf as the A 43 - was a light utility aircraft developed in Germany in 1932. The last project undertaken by the company under the technical direction of Henrich Focke, it was a high-wing strut-braced monoplane of conventional design, with fixed tailwheel undercarriage. The pilot and two passengers sat in a fully enclosed cabin. Only a single example was built.

Specifications

References

 
 
 

1930s German civil utility aircraft
Fw 043
Single-engined tractor aircraft
High-wing aircraft
Aircraft first flown in 1932